The 1939 Tour de Suisse was the seventh edition of the Tour de Suisse cycle race and was held from 5 August to 12 August 1939. The race started and finished in Zürich. The race was won by Robert Zimmermann.

General classification

References

1939
Tour de Suisse